Mertensophryne uzunguensis, also known as the Uzungwe toad, Udzungwa toad, and Udzungwa forest toad, is a species of toad in the family Bufonidae. It is endemic to Tanzania and found in the Udzungwa Mountains and the Southern Highlands. Its natural habitats are swampy montane grasslands. It is threatened by habitat loss caused by afforestation with pines, overgrazing, and agricultural expansion. Whether its range includes the Udzungwa Mountains National Park is unknown.

References

uzunguensis
Frogs of Africa
Amphibians of Tanzania
Endemic fauna of Tanzania
Amphibians described in 1932
Taxa named by Arthur Loveridge
Taxonomy articles created by Polbot